Antonín Sova (26 February 1864 – 16 August 1928) was a Czech poet and the director of Prague Municipal Library.

Life 

He was born in Pacov, a small town in South Bohemia, then part of the Austrian Empire, but from the age of two he grew up in nearby Lukavec. His father Jan was a teacher and choirmaster who occasionally composed. His mother died when he was 15 and his father married again (Sova never had a positive relationship with his stepmother Sabina). In Lukavec Antonín became acquainted with the sisters of Jaroslav Vrchlický. He studied at the grammar school in Pelhřimov, Tábor, and from 1881 to 1885 in Písek. He met the Písek-based poet Adolf Heyduk who helped him publish his first poems in literary magazines (he used the pen-names Ilja Georgov and for Lumír Valburga Turková). While at school he received the worst possible mark for morale because he ignored the interdict and wore a Czech tricolor tie in a park.  
He started studying law in Prague but he did not finish for lack of money. Jaroslav Vrchlický helped him find employment in Otto's encyclopedia editorial department which lasted for only a year. His next job was at the medical department of the Prague municipality. Eventually, from 1898 till he retired, he worked as a director of the Prague Municipal Library. 
He married Marie Kovaříková, who was almost 20 years younger, in 1900, and had a son Jan with her a year later. Their marriage broke up after several years, though. The poet contracted a disease that paralysed him for the last two decades of his life (probably syphilis). After the constitution of Czechoslovakia in 1918 he lived in Prague and was often visited by younger poets of various styles and political inclinations. In 1924 he moved "in his horsehair grave" to Pacov, where he died on a stormy August night in 1928. The funeral took place in Prague but his ashes were taken to a granite stone in Pacov.

Early literary career 
In 1897 Sova was among the writers who established the first Czech official literary association, called Máj.

Sova was a supporter of the progressive national movement of the 1890s connected with the Omladina Trial. Together with 11 other writers he signed the manifesto called Česká moderna in 1895 to demand free speech, social reforms and individualism in art. The reflection of the manifesto in Sova's work is the collection  (Uprisen Griefs, 1897).

Theodor Mommsen 

In 1897 Theodor Mommsen wrote a nationalist letter addressed to Germans in Austria (An die Deutschen in Österreich) and it was published in Vienna's Neue Freie Presse. Mommsen called Czechs "apostles of barbarism" and wrote that "the Czech skull is impervious to reason, but it is susceptible to blows". Antonín Sova wrote an answer in verses, To Theodor Mommsen.

The poem, in which he calls Mommsen a "covetous dotard" and an "arrogant spokesman of slavery", became the national answer to the German imperialism of that time, and Sova started to be one of the most famous poets of his generation.

Later work 
Údolí nového království (Valley of a New Kingdom, 1900), Dobrodružství odvahy (Adventures of Courage, 1906) – collections of social poetry, the new utopian kingdom is a symbol of hope
Ještě jednou se vrátíme (We Will Return Once More, 1900) – intimate poetry about passionate love and the bitterness of life
Lyriky lásky a života (Lyrics of Love and Life, 1907), Drsná láska (Scathing Love, 1927) – collections of poems about falling into and recovering from love
Povídky a menší črty (1903), O milkování, lásce a zradě (1909) – collections of short stories
Ivův román (Ivo's Novel, 1902), Výpravy chudých (The Poor's Tours, 1903), Tóma Bojar (1910) – psychological and social novels
Pankrác Budecius, kantor (Pankrác Budecius the Teacher, 1916) – novel about a rural teacher in the 18th century

References

External links

 Biography and works (in Czech)

1864 births
1928 deaths
People from Pacov
People from the Kingdom of Bohemia
Czech poets
Czech male poets
Symbolist poets